Gary Buckley (born 3 March 1961) is an English former professional footballer who made 71 appearances in the Football League as a midfielder for Manchester City, Preston North End and Bury.

References

1961 births
Living people
Footballers from Manchester
English footballers
Association football midfielders
Manchester City F.C. players
Preston North End F.C. players
Chorley F.C. players
Bury F.C. players
English Football League players